Como Township is an inactive township in New Madrid County, in the U.S. state of Missouri.

Como Township was established in 1888, taking its name from the community of Como, Missouri.

References

Townships in Missouri
Townships in New Madrid County, Missouri